Dalyoni Bolo is a village and jamoat in north-west Tajikistan. It is located in Devashtich District in Sughd Region. The jamoat has a total population of 23,670 (2015).

References

External links
Satellite map at Maplandia.com

Populated places in Sughd Region
Jamoats of Tajikistan